The Indie RPG Awards are annual, creator-based awards for Indie role-playing games and supplements.  They were established in 2002 by Andy Kitkowski, and are the most sought-after awards in the Indie RPG community.

For the purposes of the Awards, there exists a following "definition" of an Indie role-playing game:

 A game where the creator is the person who has written at least 50% of the actual game content.
 A game where the creator has full control of content and publishing.
 A game where the creator is the publisher, with full control over expenses and profits.

Categories
The following categories for nominations have been used throughout the history of the awards:
Indie Game of the Year - the main award for Indie Games.
Indie Supplement of the Year - for best Supplement for an Indie Game.
Best Free Game - for free Indie Games.
Best Support - for the publisher has best supported a previously published game or supplement.
Best Production - for best written and most attractive Indie Games.
Most Innovative Game - for games that stretch the RPG experience in new ways.

Additional categories were awarded in the first years of the awards:
Best Use of the d20 License - presented only in 2002
Indie RPG Zine of the Year - presented only in 2002
Best Synergy - a game with a synergistic relationship between the setting and the rules; presented only in 2002 and 2003.
Indie RPG "Human of the Year" - for Indie RPG creators and supporters; presented only in 2002 and 2003.
Andy's Choice Award - determined by the originator of the awards; presented only in 2002, 2003 and 2004.
People's Choice Award - decided by popular vote for best game and best supplement; presented only in 2004.

Winners

2002
 Indie Game of the Year: Dust Devils by Matt Snyder
 Indie Supplement of the Year: Charnel Gods by Ron Edwards
 Best Free Game: Nicotine Girls by Paul Czege
 Best Use of the d20 License: The Kid's Colouring Book o Critters - Celebrity Edition by M. Jason Parent
 Best Production: Children of the Sun by Lewis Pollack
 Best Support: The Riddle of Steel by Jacob Norwood
 Best Synergy: Dust Devils
 Most Innovative Game: Universalis by Ralph Mazza and Mike Holmes
 Indie RPG "Human of the Year": Ron Edwards
 Indie RPG Zine of the Year: The Shadowrun Supplemental
 Andy's Choice: Charnel Gods by Scott Knipe

2003
 Indie Game of the Year: My Life with Master by Paul Czege
 Indie Supplement of the Year: JAGS Have-Not
 Best Free Game: FATE by Fred Hicks
 Best Production: My Life with Master
 Best Support: FATE
 Best Synergy: My Life with Master
 Most Innovative Game: My Life with Master
 Indie RPG "Human of the Year": Luke Crane (spelled as Power of the Year)
 Andy's Choice: FATE

2004
 Indie Game of the Year: Dogs in the Vineyard by D. Vincent Baker
 Indie Supplement of the Year: Monster Burner by Luke Crane
 Best Free Game: The Shadow of Yesterday by Clinton R. Nixon
 People's Choice - Best Game: Dead Inside by Chad Underkoffler
 People's Choice - Best Supplement: Monster Burner 
 Best Production: A/State by Malcolm Craig
 Best Support: Monster Burner
 Most Innovative Game: Dogs in the Vineyard
 Andy's Choice: Primetime Adventures by Matt Wilson

2005
 Indie Game of the Year: Polaris by Ben Lehman
 Indie Supplement of the Year: Burning Sands: Jihad by Luke Crane
 Best Free Game: Perfect20 by Levi Kornelsen
 Best Production: Artesia by Mark Smylie
 Best Support: Truth & Justice by Chad Underkoffler
 Most Innovative Game: Polaris

2006
 Indie Game of the Year: Spirit of the Century by Fred Hicks
 Indie Supplement of the Year: Dictionary of Mu by Judd Carlman
 Best Free Game: JAGS Revised by Marco Chacon
 Best Production: Burning Empires by Luke Crane
 Best Support: Burning Empires
 Most Innovative Game: Lacuna Part 1, second attempt by Jared Sorensen

2007
 Indie Game of the Year: Grey Ranks by Jason Morningstar
 Indie Supplement of the Year: The Blossoms are Falling by Luke Crane
 Best Free Game: Classroom Deathmatch by Jake Diamond and Matt Schlotte
 Best Production: Reign by Greg Stolze
 Best Support: The Blossoms are Falling
 Most Innovative Game: Grey Ranks

2008
 Indie Game of the Year: Mouse Guard Roleplaying Game by Luke Crane and David Petersen
 Indie Supplement of the Year: Don't Lose Your Mind by Benjamin Baugh
 Best Free Game: (tie) Sea Dracula by Jake Richmond and Nick Smith and Sufficiently Advanced by Colin Fredericks 
 Best Production: Mouse Guard
 Best Support: Mouse Guard
 Most Innovative Game: Sweet Agatha by Kevin Allen Jr.

2009
 Indie Game of the Year: Kagematsu by Danielle Lewon
 Indie Supplement of the Year: The Day after Ragnarok by Kenneth Hite
 Best Free Game: Lady Blackbird: Adventures in the Wild Blue Yonder by John Harper
 Best Production: Lady Blackbird: Adventures in the Wild Blue Yonder
 Best Support: Fiasco by Jason Morningstar
 Most Innovative Game: A Penny for My Thoughts by Paul Tevis

2010
 Indie Game of the Year: Apocalypse World by D. Vincent Baker
 Indie Supplement of the Year: The Hot War Transmission by Malcolm Craig and Scott Dorward
 Best Free Game: Stars Without Number by Kevin Crawford
 Best Production: Freemarket by Luke Crane and Jared Sorensen
 Best Support: Apocalypse World
 Most Innovative Game: Apocalypse World

2011
 Indie Game of the Year: Do: Pilgrims of the Flying Temple by Daniel Solis
 Indie Supplement of the Year: Fiasco Companion by Jason Morningstar and Steve Segedy
 Best Free Game: Anima Prime by Christian Griffen
 Best Production: Do: Pilgrims of the Flying Temple
 Best Support: Fiasco Companion
 Most Innovative Game: Do: Pilgrims of the Flying Temple

2012
 Indie Game of the Year: Dungeon World by Sage LaTorra and Adam Koebel
 Indie Supplement of the Year: [[Fiasco (role-playing game)|American Disasters (for Fiasco)]] by Jason Morningstar and Steve Segedy
 Best Free Game: Mythender by Ryan Macklin
 Best Production: Dungeon World
 Best Support: Dungeon World
 Most Innovative Game: Dog Eat Dog by Liam Burke

2013
 Indie Game of the Year: Hillfolk by Robin D. Laws
 Indie Supplement of the Year: Adventures on Dungeon Planet by Johnstone Metzger
 Best Production: Torchbearer (role-playing game) by Thor Olavsrud and Luke Crane
 Best Support: Hillfolk
 Most Innovative Game: The Quiet Year by Joe Mcdaldno

2014
 Indie Game of the Year: The Clay That Woke by Paul Czege
 Indie Supplement of the Year: Deep Carbon Observatory by Patrick Stewart, Scrap Princess
 Best Free Game: Dream Askew by Joe Mcdaldno 
 Best Production: A Red and Pleasant Land by Zak S.
 Best Support: Deep Carbon Observatory
 Most Innovative Game: The Clay That Woke

2015
 Indie Game of the Year: Night Witches (role-playing game) by Jason Morningstar
 Indie Supplement of the Year: Fiasco Playset Anthology by Bully Pulpit Games
 Best Free Game: Sign by Hakan Seyalioglu and Kathryn Hymes 
 Best Production: Fall of Magic by Ross Cowman
 Best Support: World-Wide Wrestling Role-Playing Game by Nathan D. Paoletta 
 Most Innovative Game: Fall of Magic

2016 

 Indie Game of the Year: Blades in the Dark by John Harper
 Indie Supplement of the Year: Microscope Explorer by Ben Robbins
 Best Free Game: Quill: A Letter-Writing Roleplaying Game for a Single Player by Scott Malthouse
 Best Production: Blades in the Dark by John Harper
 Best Support: Blades in the Dark by John Harper
 Most Innovative Game: #Feminism: A Nano-Game Anthology by Edited by Misha Bushyager, Lizzie Stark, and Anna Westerling

2017 

 Indie Game of the Year: The Watch (role-playing game) by Anna Kreider and Andrew Medeiros
 Indie Supplement of the Year: Itras By: The Menagerie by Ole Peder Giaver and others
 Best Production:Timewatch by Kevin Kulp and others 
 Best Support: Timewatch 
 Most Innovative Game: Alas for the Awful Sea by Hayley Gordon, Vee Hendro

Notes

External links
 Indie RPG Awards website
 previous Indie RPG Awards website (archived)

Awards established in 2002
Indie role-playing games
Game awards